The 1993 German Formula Three Championship was a multi-event motor racing championship for single-seat open wheel formula racing cars that held across Europe. The championship featured drivers competing in two-litre Formula Three racing cars majorly built by Dallara which conform to the technical regulations, or formula, for the championship. It commenced on 3 April at Zolder and ended at Hockenheim on 19 September after ten double-header rounds.

Opel Team WTS driver Jos Verstappen became the first Dutch champion. He won eight races and collected another six podium finishes. Massimiliano Angelelli finished as runner-up with win at Diepholz Airfield Circuit, losing 41 points to Verstappen. Sascha Maassen won at Hockenheimring, Nürburgring and Alemannenring. Michael Krumm and Roberto Colciago completed the top-five in the drivers' championship. Markus Liesner and Jörg Müller were the other race winners. Patrick Bernhardt clinched the B-Cup championship title.

Teams and drivers
{|
|

Calendar
With the exception of round at Zolder in Belgium, all rounds took place on German soil.

Results

Championship standings

A-Class
Points are awarded as follows:

References

External links
 

German Formula Three Championship seasons
Formula Three season